Big Satilla Creek is a  tributary of the Little Satilla River in the U.S. state of Georgia. It is part of the Satilla River watershed of southeastern Georgia.

The creek rises in Hazlehurst in Jeff Davis County and flows south, then southeast. After leaving Jeff Davis County, it forms the boundary between Appling and Bacon counties, then Appling and Pierce counties, and finally Wayne and Pierce counties.  It joins Little Satilla Creek southwest of Screven to form the Little Satilla River.

See also
List of rivers of Georgia

References 

USGS Hydrologic Unit Map - State of Georgia (1974)

Rivers of Georgia (U.S. state)
Rivers of Jeff Davis County, Georgia
Rivers of Appling County, Georgia
Rivers of Bacon County, Georgia
Rivers of Pierce County, Georgia
Rivers of Wayne County, Georgia